Inga enterolobioides is a species of plant in the family Fabaceae. It is found only in Brazil.

References

enterolobioides
Flora of Brazil
Critically endangered plants
Taxonomy articles created by Polbot